Paanivadathilakan P. K. Narayanan Nambiar is an Indian musician, known for his virtuosity in Mizhavu, a traditional percussion instrument and his scholarship in the art of Koodiyattom. He is considered to be one of the masters of Koodiyattom. In 2008, he was awarded Padmashri by Government of India for his services to the art.

Life Sketch
P. K. Narayanan Nambiar was born in Killikurissimangalam, in Palakkad, Kerala famous koodiyattom maestro Mani Madhava Chakiar and Kochampilli Kunjimalu Nangiaramma, a known Nangiarkoothu artist in 1927. He did his early schooling in gurukula system in Killikkurissimangalam under the tutelage of his father. Later, he started learning koodiyattom from his father and gurus like Kochampilli Raman Nambiar and Meledath Govindan Nambiar and mastered the art of playing mizhavu.

Nambiar's debut was at the Kottakkal Kovilakam Siva temple in Malappuram in 1948 at the age of 21. He started his career as a Kutiyattam actor in 1954 at Lakkidi Kunjan Memorial Library where he played Arjuna in Subradhananjayam, which was the first time the art of Koodiyattom was performed outside the four walls of a temple. Nambiar, was the first person outside the caste of Chakiar to perform as an actor in Koodiyattom. In 1966, he joined Kerala Kalamandalam, as the Guru of mizhavu. Known mizhavu performers such as Easwaran Unni, V.K.K. Hariharan and Edanadu Unnikrishnan Nambiar were his students in Kalamandalm.

Nambiar is married to Santha Nangiaramma, a performer in her younger days. He has two sons and two daughters, all of them are known artists. His daughter, Vasanthi Narayanan is an exponent of both Koodiyattom and Nangiarkoothu and performs as a member of the gurukulam while the second daughter, Dr. C.K. Jayanthi is a Sanskrit scholar with specialisation in koodiyattom serving at the Sanskrit University. Both the sons, Unnikrishnan Nambiar and Harish Nambiar are well-known mizhavu, koothu and pathakam artists. In fact Harish is the only non-Chakyar to perform the intricate Mantrankam.

Legacy

Narayanan Nambiar is credited with evolving a scheme for imparting systematic training on the mizhavu during his time at kalamandalam where he served until his retirement in 1988. He developed a unique form of jugalbandi involving mizhavu and edakka, another percussion instrument called Mizhavu Thayambaka. He is also admired for his efforts and contributions in reviving Nangiar Koothu, the female aspect of Koodiyattam, which is a female solo performance.

Nambiar authored several Attaprakarams (Stage Manuals) for Koodiiyattom such as the staging of Kaliyaankam, the performance manual of which was composed over 400 years ago. He also initiated a new dance form in the play called Hallisakam. He is also noted for his contribution in the form of the reworked version of Matha Vilasom Prahasanam, a 400-year-old Koodiyattom play which was re-constructed and choreographed to give a new style of presentation.

Nambiar presently runs a school of arts, Padmashri Madhava Chakyar Gurukulam which is considered a seat of learning for Koodiyattom by Lalit Kala Akademi.

Awards
 Padmashri by Government of India
 Fellowship by Kalamandalam
 Kerala Sangeetha Nataka Akademi Award (1993)
 Nritha Natya Puraskaram by Kerala State Government
 Central Sangeet Natak Akademi Award

Works
 Mantrankam koothu – based on the third act of Bhasa's Prathinja Yougandharayana
 Sreekrishnancharitam Nangiarkoothu – based on Subhadradhananjayam
 Taalam in Koodiyattom – considered to be the only authentic work of its kind.

Narayanan Nambiar has also contributed to the literature of Koodiyattom by way of articles including over 30 seminar papers and has also traced out 25 unknown manuscripts in Sanskrit.

References

External links
 Biography
 Profile on Kerala Tourism
 on The Hindu daily
 Life sketch
 
 Mizhavu Thayambaka
 Gurukulam web site
 in The Hindu daily

1927 births
Malayali people
Recipients of the Padma Shri in arts
Living people
Indian percussionists
Musicians from Palakkad
Recipients of the Sangeet Natak Akademi Award
20th-century Indian musicians
Koodiyattam exponents
Recipients of the Kerala Sangeetha Nataka Akademi Award